Hugo Lindgren is an American magazine and newspaper editor. He was the editor of The New York Times Magazine from 2010 to 2013 and the acting editor of The Hollywood Reporter.   He runs the production company Page 1 Productions with the filmmaker Mark Boal. In 2009 he coined the neologism "pessimism porn" to describe the alleged eschatological and survivalist thrill some people derive from reading about and preparing for the collapse of civil society from a global economic crisis.

Personal life 
Lindgren lives in New York City with his wife, writer Sarah Bernard, and his twin daughters. Lindgren attended Duke University.

References

Living people
American magazine editors
Year of birth missing (living people)
The New York Times editors
Duke University alumni